Monkey Quest was a massively multiplayer online game published by Nickelodeon in 2011. Nickelodeon described the game as having an "online experience that has the look and feel of a console game mixed with cooperative play." It was first revealed at the 2011 Game Developers Conference before its release later that year at the 2011 Kids' Choice Awards. Monkey Quest closed on September 26, 2014, due to a "shifting focus towards other digital and mobile experiences." The app Monkey Quest: Thunderbow was removed from the App Store on July 31, 2014.

After the game's discontinuation, numerous attempts at resurrecting the game have been made. One of the more notable projects was named "Monkey Quest Reborn", a community-driven recreation of the original game. It was ultimately shut down by Paramount Global, Nickelodeon's parent company, for Digital Millennium Copyright Act complaints against them. As of January 2023 the series remains dormant in all official capacities.

Story
The game took place in the land of Ook. The Monkey King was dying, and players needed to explore the world and find a way to cure him. Throughout the world, players would meet many inhabitants and complete many quests. They could meet friends, buy new objects, visit the Mayor Bumbee, battle monsters and much more. As the user played, their monkey unlocked more lands, discovered more about the legendary Monkey King, and could even become the leader of a tribe.

Tribes
There were five monkey tribes available:
 The Chim Foo
 The Sea Dragons
 The Ootu Mystics
 The Ice Raiders

And the fifth and final tribe, the Mek-Tek (Mechanical Technology). This tribe was never playable as the game was shut down before it was released.

Quests
There were a large number of Quests available throughout the game. There were 4 different kinds of Main Quests could only be done once by every player. As the player leveled up their character, main quests would become more difficult to complete.

Daily Quests
Daily Quests could be done once a day by any player, regardless of their current level.

Side Quests
Side Quests - Quests that could be done in addition to the other quest types.

Multiplayer Quests
Quests that required 2 or more players. Most of these only required 2, but some required 3 players. A Pet could also help in these quests.

Stages
There were 6 kinds of Quests in Monkey Quest. Each type depended on which section of Ook the player is in.

 Mek-Tek (Mechanical Technology), was never available to begin with, due to the fact that the game was shut down before it was ever released.
 Sea Dragons
 Ootu Mystics
 Chim Foo
 Ice Raiders

Due to an update, all players (non-members and members) could access trails. This followed the deletion of NC Trail Keys and Guest Passes.

Gameplay

Controls
To explore the worlds of Ook, players used the arrow keys on their keyboard. Jumping was controlled by pressing the space bar and pressing the arrow keys whilst jumping allowed the player to jump in that direction. Pressing the space bar then the down arrow whilst in midair made the character do a dive bomb towards the ground. The player could also press either the CTRL key or the X key on their keyboard whilst facing an in-game NPC to either access new quests or obtain various information about Ook and its residents. The game had five equippable hot keys (C, V, B, N, and M) to control weapons, potions, pets and any other items players wished to access quickly.

Currency
There were two types of currency in Monkey Quest. The main type of currency was bananas, which were commonly earned from quests and could be used at a vendor to buy items, whilst the other currency, NC (Nick Cash) could be bought with real money or could be earned by leveling up and could be used to buy items from the NC mall which was located at the bottom right corner of the screen in Monkey Quest.

Membership
There were membership plans that allow players to pay real life money for special features in the game such as access to all trails, the ability to join each tribe, along with accessing certain areas only available to paid members.

Possibility of a film adaptation
In August 2012, Variety reported that Paramount Animation (a subsidiary of Viacom along with Nickelodeon) was in the process of starting development of several animated movies with budgets of around US$100 million. According to Variety, the intellectual property for these films, which is to be supplied by Nickelodeon among others, included Monkey Quest.

Since the film's announcement in 2012, no new information on the film has been shared, and the movie was likely cancelled alongside the game's closure.

Closure
On August 14, 2014, Nickelodeon announced that after 4 years of operation, Monkey Quest was being shut down permanently on September 26, 2014. Subsequently, every player was given membership for the remaining time of the game. Players were offered refunds for their memberships if they contacted Nickelodeon within a given time before the game shut down. The website was also updated with a closing message on the index page. The Monkey Quest website did not close until January 30, 2016. The game remained open for a month after the announcement, finally closing on the set date, September 26, 2014. After the game's closure, Monkey Quest's website was updated with a new FAQ to help with billing support and inform users about the game's closure. Monkey Quest's site, monkeyquest.com, now redirects to Nickelodeon's Facebook page.

References

2011 video games
American children's websites
Behaviour Interactive games
Crossover video games
Fictional monkeys
Inactive massively multiplayer online games
Massively multiplayer online games
Nickelodeon video games
Products and services discontinued in 2014
Video games developed in Canada
Works based on Journey to the West